The 130th Regiment Illinois Volunteer Infantry was an infantry regiment that served in the Union Army during the American Civil War.

Service
The 130th Illinois Infantry was organized at Camp Butler, Illinois, and mustered into Federal service on October 25, 1862, for a three-year enlistment.

The regiment was mustered out of service on August 15, 1865.

Total strength and casualties
The regiment suffered 2 officers and 18 enlisted men who were killed in action or who died of their wounds and 4 officers and 153 enlisted men who died of disease, for a total of 177 fatalities.

Members
Colonel Nathaniel Niles - resigned on May 6, 1864
Major Jacob W. Wilkin, future Justice of the Supreme Court of Illinois
Lieutenant Colonel John B. Reid - mustered out with the regiment

See also
List of Illinois Civil War Units
Illinois in the American Civil War

Notes

References
The Civil War Archive

Units and formations of the Union Army from Illinois
1862 establishments in Illinois
Military units and formations established in 1862
Military units and formations disestablished in 1865